Thirteen first ladies of the United States have written a total of twenty-two memoirs. The first lady is the hostess of the White House, and the position is traditionally filled by the wife of the president of the United States, with some historical exceptions. Every memoir by a first lady published in the 20th and 21st centuries has been a bestseller, at times outselling those of their presidential husbands.

In the early 1800s, Abigail Adams had her correspondence published as Letters of Mrs. Adams, the Wife of John Adams, and Louisa Adams "made several attempts at an autobiography", though she never sought to publish them. The Memoirs and Letters of Dolley Madison, Wife of James Madison, President of the United States were published in 1886 but were actually edited by Lucia Cutts and written by Dolley Madison's niece Mary Cutts. 

Julia Grant was the first to write and attempt to publish her memoirs, writing The Personal Memoirs of Julia Dent Grant in the 1890s after the death of her husband Ulysses S. Grant. However, she never found a suitable publisher for them before her death in 1902, in part because she had unrealistic expectations of their value. The memoirs were eventually published in 1975. Helen Taft was the first to have memoirs published during her lifetime, in 1914. Memoirs by presidential spouses were uncommon until the 1970s; in the decades after Taft, only Edith Wilson, Grace Coolidge, Eleanor Roosevelt, and Lady Bird Johnson wrote and published their memoirs. Coolidge had her memoirs published in the 1930s as several articles in The American Magazine. Most first ladies have written and published at least one memoir about their life since Betty Ford's publication of her first memoir in the late 1970s.

Early published memoirs focused on relatively trivial matters, often largely focusing on the first lady's personal life. Helen Taft's memoirs were described by The New York Sun as "bright, witty, delightfully entertaining reminiscences" upon publication, and Edith Wilson's My Memoir was criticized by contemporary reviewers such as The New York Times for excessively focusing on clothing and social events. Eleanor Roosevelt, who wrote four autobiographies, marked a shift in the content of the memoirs, writing more about political issues and less on her personal life. Lady Bird Johnson condensed a dictated two-million-word transcript into 300,000 for A White House Diary, which outsold her husband Lyndon B. Johnson's memoir. In the 1960s Jacqueline Kennedy Onassis was involved in editing two books by Molly Thayer, Jacqueline Kennedy and Jacqueline Kennedy: The White House Years.

Memoirs written by Betty Ford, Rosalynn Carter and Barbara Bush also outsold the memoirs of their husbands. My Turn by Nancy Reagan, published in 1989, was nicknamed My Burn for its "vengeful" coverage of Reagan's life, particularly in the White House. The book sold very well, remaining on The New York Times Best Seller list for more than three months. Michelle Obama's memoir Becoming was published in 2018. She received over $60 million in advance of publication, and the book had sold over 11.5 million copies . There has been speculation that Melania Trump is writing a memoir or in talks to do so.

Memoirs

See also

 List of American political memoirs
 List of autobiographies by presidents of the United States

Notes and references

Notes

References

Further reading

 
United States First Ladies autobiographies